Demirci is a town (belde) and municipality in the Gülağaç District, Aksaray Province, Turkey. Its population is 4,051 (2021).

References

Populated places in Aksaray Province
Towns in Turkey
Gülağaç District